Estrela do Norte or variant, may refer to:

Places
Estrela do Norte, São Paulo, a municipality in the state of São Paulo, Brazil
Estrela do Norte, Goiás, a municipality in the state of Goiás, Brazil

Ships
 Estrella Do Norte, a Mersey-class trawler
 Estrella do norte, a Portugeuse ship wrecked on a North Sea sandbank in 1815; see List of shipwrecks in 1815

Other uses
Estrela do Norte Futebol Clube, Cachoeiro do Itapemirim, Espírito Santo state, Brazil

See also

 Estrela do Sul
 Norte (disambiguation)
 Estrela (disambiguation)
 Estrella del norte (disambiguation)
 Étoile du Nord (disambiguation)
 Nordstern (disambiguation)
 Nordstar (disambiguation)
 Northstar (disambiguation)
 North Star (disambiguation)
 Northern Star (disambiguation)
 Star of the North (disambiguation)